CSM Bucuresti was a Romanian rugby union team based in București, that played in the CEC Bank SuperLiga.

Honours
Cupa României:
Winners (2): 2017, 2018
Cupa Regelui:
Winners (1): 2018

Last squad before dissolution

 
 

 
 
 
 

 

 

 

 

note - Players in bold have played at least one match for their national team.

See also
 Romania national rugby union team

References

External links
 Official website
 SuperLiga squad details
 Squad details
 PlanetaOvala.ro - Romanian rugby news
 

Rugby Union
Romanian rugby union teams
Rugby clubs established in 2007
Rugby union clubs disestablished in 2019
Defunct Romanian rugby union teams
Sport in Bucharest